Tri-Rail and Metrorail Transfer station is a Metrorail and Tri-Rail interchange station in Hialeah, Florida, northwest of the city of Miami proper.

This station is located near the intersection of East 25th Street and East 11th Avenue in Hialeah, Florida, officially opening for service on March 6, 1989. The station was built as a connection for the Tri-Rail and Metrorail rail systems; though the Amtrak station, which is served by the Silver Meteor and Silver Star, is located only a few blocks away, it is not officially connected to this station. The Amtrak station was scheduled to be moved to the Miami Intermodal Center by late 2018, but was delayed by several years due to a platform length issue. A third Tri-Rail/Metrorail transfer station will begin service by 2023 at MiamiCentral, which provides direct access into Downtown Miami along with additional transfer options such as Brightline and Metromover.

Station layout

The elevated Metrorail station is directly connected to the southbound Tri-Rail platform at the south end of the complex. Access between Tri-Rail platforms is available via an elevated overpass over the tracks at the north end of the complex.

The station can be highly congested during rush hour, being one of the busiest Tri-Rail stations, though it has among the lowest ridership for Metrorail. Most of the congestion was relieved with the opening of the Tri-Rail portion of the Miami Airport station in 2015, which facilitates a closer rapid transit point to the central business district.

External links
South Florida Regional Transportation Authority – Metrorail Transfer station
MDT – Metrorail Stations
Miami Intermodal Center
 Tri-Rail Station from 79th Street from Google Maps Street View

Green Line (Metrorail)
Hialeah, Florida
Metrorail (Miami-Dade County) stations in Miami-Dade County, Florida
Tri-Rail stations in Miami-Dade County, Florida
Railway stations in the United States opened in 1989
Union stations in the United States
1989 establishments in Florida